PSL may refer to:

Sport
Pakistan Super League, a Twenty20 cricket league in Pakistan
Philippine Super Liga, a professional volleyball league in the Philippines
Pilipinas Super League, a professional basketball league in the Philippines
Philippine Swimming League
Premier Soccer League, in South Africa
Premier Squash League, a professional squash competition in England

Business
Personal Seat License, used to get season tickets at sports stadiums
Personal Stop Loss
Process Specification Language

Computing
Portable Standard Lisp
Probabilistic soft logic
Profile Scripting Language
Property Specification Language
Public Suffix List

Organizations
 Left Socialist Party (Belgium), a Belgian political party
 Party for Socialism and Liberation, an American political party
 Pioneer Square Labs, a Seattle-based startup studio
 Polish People's Party, a Polish political party
 , a Colombian software development and outsourcing organization
 Université Paris Sciences et Lettres, a French university
 Social Liberal Party (Brazil), a Brazilian political party
 Social Liberal Party (Moldova), a political party
 Social Liberal Party (Tunisia), a Tunisian political party

Places
Perth Airport (Scotland), IATA airport code
Port St. Lucie, Florida
Port Sunlight railway station, England; National Rail station code PSL

Science and technology
Percentage of the speed of light
Photostimulated luminescence
Polystyrene Latex
Process Specification Language

Other uses
Palestinian Sign Language, sign language used in the Palestinian territories
Parallel strand lumber, a form of engineered wood
Professional support lawyer
PSL (rifle), Romanian designated marksman rifle
PSLn, the projective special linear group
Pumpkin Spice Latte, specifically used by Starbucks Corporation

See also
Psi (disambiguation)